Andrew Ross is an American musician. He has been the guitarist, keyboardist and vocalist for the rock band OK Go since 2005. He is also behind a solo project, Secret Dakota Ring, which released albums in 2004 and 2008. Ross is also co-founder of Serious Business Records, a label under which Secret Dakota Ring publish their records. Andy is lead developer of a mobile game developer company Space Inch, LLC.

Biography 
Ross attended Columbia University, where he had studied computer science, and became the bassist for the band Unsacred Hearts and guitarist for DraculaZombieUSA. Ross was also the bassist for a brief stint in early 2000s indie band Cold Memory, and was also the headliner for The A-Ross Experience. Other early bands include Phter, D-Funky and the Beechmont Chilles, and Conjugal Visit.

In 2004, he released an album, Do Not Leave The Baggage All The Way, under the solo project name Secret Dakota Ring.  Ross described his freshman album as a 'break up album' at a Google artists performance.

In early 2005, he became a member of OK Go after auditioning to replace the band's former guitarist and keyboardist Andy Duncan, who left after production on their second album, Oh No, was finished.

A second Secret Dakota Ring album, entitled Cantarell, was released on November 11, 2008.

Discography 
Secret Dakota Ring has released two studio albums:
 Do Not Leave Baggage All the Way (2004)
Cantarell (2008)

References

External links 

 Band blog

Living people
1979 births
American rock guitarists
American male guitarists
American indie rock musicians
Columbia School of Engineering and Applied Science alumni
Musicians from Worcester, Massachusetts
Grammy Award winners
OK Go members
Guitarists from Massachusetts